Paloh is a mukim in Malaysia.

Paloh may also refer to:
Paloh, Sarawak
Paloh (federal constituency), formerly represented in the Dewan Rakyat (1978–90)
Paloh (Kelantan state constituency), represented in the Kelantan State Legislative Assembly
Paloh (Johor state constituency), represented in the Johor State Legislative Assembly
Paloh (film)